The sharp-beaked ground finch (Geospiza difficilis) is a species of bird in the Darwin's finch group of the tanager family Thraupidae. It is classified as a least-concern species by the International Union for Conservation of Nature and it is native to the Galápagos Islands in Ecuador. This finch was  described by Richard Bowdler Sharpe in 1888.

This relatively small, slender-billed finch is endemic to the Galápagos Islands, where it is found on Fernandina, Santiago, Pinta, Genovesa, Darwin, and Wolf Islands. On the first three islands, it breeds in the humid highlands and disperses afterwards, but on the remaining smaller and lower islands the sharp-beaked ground finch is found in the arid zone year-round. Due to habitat destruction its range has decreased. It was formerly also present in the highlands of several other islands, and it is possible it still occurs on Isabela.

Both the vampire ground finch and the Genovesa ground finch were considered subspecies.  The International Ornithologists' Union have split them, while other taxonomic authorities still consider them conspecific.

References

sharp-beaked ground finch
Endemic birds of the Galápagos Islands
sharp-beaked ground finch
Taxonomy articles created by Polbot